The Masonic Temple (also known as Masonic Temple, Most Worshipful Union Grand Lodge PHA) is a historic Masonic temple in Jacksonville, Florida. It is located at 410 Broad Street. Constructed by the Grand Lodge between 1901 and 1912, it was added to the U.S. National Register of Historic Places on September 22, 1980.

The building currently contains retail space and non-Masonic office space as well as the offices and meeting rooms for the Most Worshipful Union Grand Lodge of Florida and Belize (a Prince Hall Masonic Grand Lodge).

References

External links
 
 Duval County listings at National Register of Historic Places
 Florida's Office of Cultural and Historical Programs
 Duval County listings
 Masonic Temple
 Famous Floridians of Jacksonville

Masonic buildings completed in 1912
Office buildings in Jacksonville, Florida
Buildings and structures in Jacksonville, Florida
History of Jacksonville, Florida
National Register of Historic Places in Jacksonville, Florida
Masonic buildings in Florida
Prince Hall Masonic buildings in the United States
Clubhouses on the National Register of Historic Places in Florida
Chicago school architecture in Florida
Prairie School architecture in Florida
LaVilla, Jacksonville
1912 establishments in Florida
African-American history in Jacksonville, Florida